K'ipakhara (Quechua k'ipa decomposed rests of plants in the field used as fertilizer, khara dung, Hispanicized spelling Quepacara) is an archaeological site in Peru. It is situated in the Huánuco Region, Huamalíes Province, Llata District.

References 

Archaeological sites in Peru
Archaeological sites in Huánuco Region